Edward Welch (composer)
Edward Welch, Welsh architect
Edward F. Welch, Jr., United States Navy admiral
Edward J. Welch
Edward Welch House